Plinio Ansèlme Brusa (27 August 1899 – 24 July 1969) was an Italian-Swiss-French rower who competed for France in the coxed pair event. Together with André Giriat and coxswain Pierre Brunet he won the French championships in 1927 and 1931, the European title in 1931, and an Olympic bronze medal in 1932.

Brusa was Italian. He was born in Switzerland, where he won a national title in gymnastics. After World War I he immigrated to France and became a French citizen in the early 1930s.

References

1899 births
1969 deaths
French male rowers
Olympic rowers of France
Rowers at the 1932 Summer Olympics
Olympic bronze medalists for France
Olympic medalists in rowing
Medalists at the 1932 Summer Olympics
European Rowing Championships medalists
Swiss emigrants to France